Jorge Luis Bazán Lazarte (born 23 March 1991) is a Peruvian footballer who plays as a winger. He currently plays for Deportivo Garcilaso in the Peruvian Primera División.

Club career
Bazán developed as footballer in the popular youth academy of Esther Grande de Bentín and was in the same category as other rising players such as Luis Advíncula, Werner Schuler and Benjamín Ubierna.

Bazán made his Descentralizado league debut on 13 February 2011 in Round 1 of the 2011 season against Unión Comercio. At home in the Matute Stadium, he entered the match in the 71st minute for Alexander Sánchez and also managed to score his first professional goal. His debut goal was scored in the 85th minute of the match, which finished 4–1 in favor of Alianza Lima.

References

External links

1991 births
Living people
Association football wingers
Peruvian footballers
Club Alianza Lima footballers
Ayacucho FC footballers
Juan Aurich footballers
Peruvian Primera División players
Deportivo Garcilaso players